Hurricane Lane was the strongest Pacific hurricane to make landfall in Mexico since Hurricane Kenna of 2002. The thirteenth named storm, ninth hurricane, and sixth major hurricane of the 2006 Pacific hurricane season, Lane developed on September 13 from a tropical wave to the south of Mexico. It moved northwestward, parallel to the coast of Mexico, and steadily intensified in an area conducive to further strengthening. It rapidly weakened and dissipated on September 17, and later brought precipitation to southern part of the U.S. state of Texas.

Throughout its path, Lane resulted in four deaths and moderate damage. Damage was heaviest in Sinaloa, where the hurricane made landfall, including reports of severe crop damage. Across Mexico, an estimated 4,320 homes were affected by the hurricane, with about 248,000 people affected. Moderate flooding was reported in Acapulco, resulting in mudslides in some areas. Damage across the country totaled $2.2 billion (2006 MXN), or $206 million (2006 USD, or $218 million in 2010 USD).

Meteorological history

A tropical wave moved off the coast of Africa on August 31, 2006. It moved westward without development, and entered the eastern Pacific Ocean on September 10. An area of convection developed along the wave axis, several hundred miles south of the Gulf of Tehuantepec. It moved slowly westward and steadily organized. Convection and banding features organized around a developing center, and the system developed into Tropical Depression Thirteen-E on September 13. Based on a potentially developing anticyclone over the storm and a track over warm water temperatures, the Statistical Hurricane Intensity Prediction Scheme model issued a 46 percent probability for rapid intensification of the storm.

Lane continued to become better organized, with deep convection developing into a central dense overcast and well-defined outflow in the western half of the storm. Late on September 14, an eyewall began to develop a short distance off the Mexican coastline. Lane continued to strengthen as it turned more to the north-northwest, a motion caused due to the storm moving around the western periphery of a mid-level ridge over Mexico.

This made Lane the most intense hurricane to strike Mexico since Hurricane Kenna in the 2002 season. The combination of the mountainous terrain of Mexico and increasing west-southwesterly wind shear caused the storm to rapidly weaken, and the storm dissipated on September 17. The remnants of Lane later moved into Texas, United States.

Preparations
Due to Lane's projected path near the western coast of Mexico, authorities closed ports to small boats in the cities of Acapulco. Just weeks after Hurricane John took a similar path through the area, several tourists voluntarily left their vacations to fly home. Many residents boarded up buildings and bought hurricane supplies in preparation for the storm. Officials also closed schools across the state of Guerrero. In all, 40,400 tourists were evacuated from the Mexican coastline. According to the Secretaría de Gobernación, under which the Mexican Civil Protection Service operates, there were 5.5 million homes and 21 million people in 21 states threatened by the system in all of Mexico. As a result, authorities evacuated about 2,000 people to emergency shelters.

As Lane came closer to the coastline, all the seaports between Michoacán and Sinaloa were closed, and the Servicio Meteorológico Nacional (Mexico) (National Meteorological Service, in Spanish) warned the general population about the threat of flooding and landslides. When the hurricane made landfall, the government of the state of Sinaloa issued a state of emergency for the municipalities of Ahome, Guasave, Angostura, Salvador Alvarado, Culiacán, Navolato, Elota, San Ignacio and Mazatlán. The arrival of the hurricane forced the closure of several flights at the General Rafael Buelna International Airport in Mazatlán, Sinaloa.

Prior to entering the area, the U.S. National Weather Service issued a Flood Watch for large portions of Texas due to the remnants of Lane.

Impact

The heavy rainfall flooded 200 houses and caused a mudslide, resulting in the death of a seven-year-old boy. Flooding also occurred at the airport in Acapulco, though service was not interrupted. Offshore, strong waves capsized a boat, leaving one person missing. Heavy rainfall in the port of Lázaro Cárdenas, Michoacán, overflowed a canal, forcing over 500 people to evacuate their homes.  of crops were destroyed by Lane in Michoacán. Road and airport damage in Colima totaled to about $30 million (2006 MXN, $2.7 million 2006 USD). One man died in Pueblos Unidos after being knocked over by strong winds. Throughout Jalisco, 109 people had to evacuate their homes due to landslides and heavy rainfall.

In El Dorado, Sinaloa, near where the storm made landfall, the hurricane washed out away roads and destroyed many flimsy homes. Strong winds knocked down electricity towers, trees, and traffic signs, leaving many without power. In Mazatlán, to the southeast of where Lane moved ashore, the hurricane produced strong winds and heavy rains, causing street flooding and power outages. The threat of the hurricane forced the cancellation of an Independence Day Parade. Between Mazatlán and the state capital, Culiacán, the hurricane destroyed a bridge, leaving dozens of trucks stranded. In Culiacán, one person died when he drove his car into a river, while several streets were flooded from the storm. Throughout Sinaloa, several damaged roads left many communities cut off from the rest of the country. Lane caused severe agricultural damage in the state, possibly reaching as high as $600 million (2006 MXN, $55 million 2006 USD). The hurricane also damaged water treatment facilities and distribution systems in multiple communities, prompting the Secretariat of Health to declare a sanitary alert in Sinaloa. Damage in Sinaloa totaled to around $1.2 billion (2006 MXN), $109.3 million (2006 USD).

Throughout Mexico, Hurricane Lane killed four people. An estimated 4,320 homes were affected by the hurricane, with about 248,000 people affected. Water systems were damaged in nine municipalities, leaving thousands temporarily without water. In all, the hurricane caused about $2.2 billion (2006 MXN, $203 million 2006 USD) in damage in the country. In the United States, the remnants of Lane brought precipitation to southern Texas.

Aftermath
By the day after Hurricane Lane made landfall, most of the evacuated people returned to their homes to begin the cleanup process. Some tourists who remained in the area for the storm continued their vacations, while others tried to leave the area. The federal government declared a state of emergency for nine municipalities in Sinaloa, allowing emergency funds to give relief support to the affected population. Helicopters were used to distribute foods and locate cut-off residents. The government set up three temporary shelters in Mazatlán for 360 people and three shelters in Culiacán for about 1,000 affected residents. To prevent the spread of Dengue fever, officials sent epidemiologists to 67 communities, with 18 mobile units and 15 Nebulizer units. By a month after the storm, all roads and highways affected by the hurricane were open for transportation.

See also

 Other tropical cyclones named Lane
 Timeline of the 2006 Pacific hurricane season

References

External links

 The NHC's archive on Hurricane Lane.

Lane
Lane (2006)
Lane (2006)
Lane (2006)
2006 in Mexico
Lane